Thomas or Tom Bradley may refer to:

Politics
Tom Bradley (American politician) (1917–1998), mayor of Los Angeles, California, 1973–1993
Tom Bradley (British politician) (1926–2002), British Member of Parliament and trade union leader
Thomas J. Bradley (1870–1901), U.S. Representative from New York State
Thomas W. Bradley (1844–1920), U.S. Representative from New York State and Medal of Honor recipient

Other occupations
 Thomas Scrope (d. 1491/2), or (de) Bradley, English bishop; Bishop of Dromore and Assistant Bishop of Norwich
Tom Bradley (author) (born 1954), American novelist and essayist
Tom Bradley (baseball) (born 1947), former American Major League baseball player
Tom Bradley (American football) (born 1956), American football coach and former player
Thomas Bradley (priest) (1596/7–1673), Anglican clergyman, chaplain to the King
Thomas Bradley (physician) (1751–1813), English physician and editor

 Thomas Earnshaw Bradley, founder of the publication The Lamp

Places
Tom Bradley International Terminal, an airport terminal at Los Angeles International Airport named after the above Los Angeles mayor

See also
Tom Brady (disambiguation)